Chew Kin Meng (simplified Chinese: 周键明, born 1989 - Kuala Lumpur, Malaysia) is a Malaysian memory athlete and Guinness World Record holder for The Most Decimal Places of Euler's Number Memorised in 2019. He has broken a total of 7 Malaysian Memory Records and achieved the title of International Master of Memory.

Biography 
Kin Meng studied accounting at SEGi University but, he was forced to discontinue his degree due to financial complications.

He achieved the International Master of Memory title during the World Memory Championships.

In 2015, he broke 4 Malaysia Memory Records at the Asian Memory Championship and 3 Malaysia Memory Records in 2016, and ranked No. 80 Memory athlete in the world in the same year.

In 2018, he was recognized as the first International arbiter of the Global Memory Championship in China, which served as the head of the committee of arbiters of the competition.

On March 31, In 2019, he broke the Guinness World Record for The Most Decimal Places of Euler is Numbers Memorized, he successfully recited 4,556 digits of Euler's number within 1 hour, 7 minutes and 49 seconds.

Achievements 
 2019: Guinness World Records "Most decimal places of Euler’s number memorised" 
2019: Malaysia Book of records "Most decimal places of Euler’s number memorised" 
2019: Top 30 Finalists of Ten Outstanding Young Malaysians by JCI Malaysia.
2018: International Arbiter of the Global Championship, China. 
2016: Achieve International Master of Memory (IMM) Title in World Memory Championship. 
2016: Ranked No. 1 Memory athlete in Malaysia.

See also
 Sport in Malaysia

References 

Living people
1989 births
Mnemonists
Malaysian sportspeople
Malaysian people of Chinese descent